Beveridge Island may refer to:

Beveridge Island (Victoria), Australia
Beveridge Island (Nunavut), Canada